Klein Luckow is a village and a former municipality in the Vorpommern-Greifswald district, in Mecklenburg-Vorpommern, Germany. Since 1 January 2012, it is part of the municipality Jatznick.

Notable residents
 Max Schmeling (1905–2005) a German boxer who was heavyweight champion of the world between 1930 and 1932

References

Villages in Mecklenburg-Western Pomerania